Judith P. Morgan (April 27, 1930 - June 30, 2016) was a First Nations Gitxsan artist from Kitwanga, B.C.Canada.

A Gitksan and member of the Tsimshian First Nations, Morgan was born in the village of Kitwanga in British Columbia. Her father was a Tsimshian chief, and her mother was also descended from tribal leaders. At the Alberni Indian Residential School she met George Sinclair, who encouraged her in the development of her art; as a result, she won a two-year scholarship to Cottey College. In 1953 she married Willis O. Fitzpatrick, with whom she had five children; she returned to school, to the University of Kansas, to complete a bachelor's degree in art education in 1976. Morgan began showing her work in the mid-1940s, and it has been seen in venues throughout Canada and the United States. Among her awards are a first prize from the Pacific National Exhibition in Vancouver (1947) and another first prize from the Arts and Crafts Society Exhibition in Victoria (1948). Five of Morgan's paintings were purchased by the provincial government in 1949, and they have since been loaned and exhibited widely. Morgan returned to Kitwanga in 1983.

References

1930 births
2016 deaths
20th-century Canadian painters
20th-century Canadian women artists
20th-century First Nations painters
21st-century Canadian painters
21st-century Canadian women artists
21st-century First Nations people
Artists from British Columbia
Cottey College alumni
First Nations painters
First Nations women
Gitxsan people
University of Kansas alumni
First Nations women artists